The 2014 Vuelta a Burgos was the 36th edition of the Vuelta a Burgos, an annual bicycle stage race which toured the province of Burgos; it was held as part of the 2014 UCI Europe Tour, as a 2.HC classification event.

Teams
A total of 12 teams raced in the 2014 Vuelta a Burgos: 5 UCI ProTeams, 5 UCI Professional Continental teams, and 2 UCI Continental teams.

Route

Stages

Stage 1
13 August 2014 — Burgos to Burgos,

Stage 2
14 August 2014 — Briviesca to Villadiego,

Stage 3

Stage 4
16 August 2014 — Medina de Pomar to Villarcayo,

Stage 5
17 August 2014 — Aranda de Duero, individual time trial (ITT)

Classification leadership

References

External links

Vuelta a Burgos
Vuelta a Burgos
2014 in Spanish road cycling